Harmacy is the sixth album by American indie rock band Sebadoh. It was released by Sub Pop in 1996.

It is the second and final Sebadoh album to feature drummer Bob Fay, who replaced founding member Eric Gaffney in 1994.

The album cover features a photograph of a pharmacy in Cashel, Ireland, taken by band member Jason Loewenstein on tour. The missing "P" gave the album its title.

Music
As with its predecessor, Bakesale, the songwriting on Harmacy was handled primarily by Loewenstein and founding member Lou Barlow, with Fay contributing the lone track, "Sforzando!", and the band covering "I Smell a Rat" by American hard rock band The Bags. Their cover was featured on the soundtrack for the 1998 American comedy-thriller film Homegrown.

Like Bakesale, the album was a "(relatively) polished production", and featured pervasive use of electric guitars and longer song structures, marking a clear departure from the band's lo-fi, often acoustic earlier albums like their release, Sebadoh III (1991).

Solo acoustic versions of "On Fire" and "Willing to Wait" were released prior to the album's release, on the 1994 "Rebound" single and the 1995 compilation Rare on Air, Volume 2: KCRW Live, respectively.

Reception
Released in the wake of Barlow's Top 40 hit, "Natural One", with his band The Folk Implosion, Harmacy became Sebadoh's first charting album in the U.S., expanding on the success of Bakesale, and yielding the Modern Rock Tracks hit, "Ocean".

The album was well received by critics, albeit less so than Bakesale. Stephen Thompson of The Onion's The A.V. Club wrote that Harmacy "doesn't have Bakesales considerable staying power as a whole, but the strong balance of soft pop songs ("Too Pure", "Perfect Way", the elegant pop ballad "Willing to Wait") and abrasively punky rock songs ("Love To Fight", "Mind Reader", "Can't Give Up") still holds together somehow."

Harmacy was included on several year-end lists in 1996, including Rolling Stone "Ten Best Albums" (#8), the Village Voices "Pazz & Jop Critics' Poll" (#36), and the NMEs critics' poll (#38).

Proposed reissue
The album was supposed to be reissued in 2011, along with Bakesale, but never was. In a 2012 interview with blurredvisionary, Barlow explained, "[T]hey wanted me to [reissue Harmacy] and I absolutely don’t want to pursue it at all. I just can’t get excited about that record...I think anyone can find it and I don’t know how we could improve upon it unless we included the b-sides from that time, but the b-sides we did from that time I don’t know they were that great."

Track listing
"On Fire" (Barlow) – 3:36
"Prince-S" (Loewenstein) – 2:52
"Ocean" (Barlow) – 2:46
"Nothing Like You" (Loewenstein) – 3:09
"Crystal Gypsy" (Loewenstein) – 1:29
"Beauty of the Ride" (Barlow) – 2:48
"Mind Reader" (Loewenstein) – 1:50
"Sforzando!" (Fay) – 3:30
"Willing to Wait" (Barlow) – 3:32
"Hillbilly II" (Loewenstein) – 1:59
"Zone Doubt" (Loewenstein) – 2:18
"Too Pure" (Barlow) – 3:46
"Worst Thing" (Loewenstein) – 2:55
"Love to Fight" (Loewenstein) – 0:54
"Perfect Way" (Barlow) – 2:49
"Can't Give Up" (Loewenstein) – 2:02
"Open Ended" (Barlow) – 3:28
"Weed Against Speed" (Barlow) – 2:55
"I Smell a Rat" (Jon Hardy, Jim Janota, Crispin Wood) – 1:34

Personnel
Lou Barlow – lead vocals (tracks 1, 3, 6, 9, 12, 15, 17, 18), guitar (tracks 1, 3, 5, 6, 8, 9, 12, 15, 17, 18), bass (tracks 2, 4, 7, 10, 11, 13, 14, 16), mellotron (tracks 9, 12, 17), synthesizer (track 1)
Jason Loewenstein – lead vocals  (tracks 2, 4, 5, 7, 10, 11, 13, 14, 16), guitar (tracks 2, 4, 7, 10, 11, 13, 14, 16), bass (tracks 1, 3, 5, 6, 9, 12, 17), drums (tracks 8, 15, 18, 19)
Bob Fay – drums (tracks 1-7, 9-14, 16, 17), bass (tracks 8, 15, 18), lead vocals (track 19)
Additional personnel
Mark Perretta – lead guitar and bass (track 19)
Wally Gagel – engineer (tracks 3, 6, 10, 11, 14, 17), mixing (tracks 3, 6, 10, 11, 14)
Eric Masunaga – engineer (tracks 2, 7, 8, 13, 15, 16, 18, 19), mixing (tracks 2, 8, 13, 15, 18, 19)
Tim O'Heir – engineer (tracks 1, 3-6, 9-12, 14, 17), mixing (tracks 1, 3-6, 9-11, 14, 17)
Bryce Goggin – mixing (tracks 7, 12, 16)
Charles Peterson – photography

Charts

Album

Singles

References

1996 albums
Sebadoh albums
Sub Pop albums
Domino Recording Company albums
City Slang albums